Alcibiades of Apamea (fl. 230) was a Jewish Christian member of, or possibly even founder of, the Elcesaites. Of the several cities called Apamea it is Apamea in Syria which is intended. He is known only from the accounts of Hippolytus of Rome in his Refutations (Refutatio omnium haeresium, Book 10 ch. 9–13), where he follows on from Hippolytus' attacks on Pope Callixtus I:

References

3rd-century Christians
Early Jewish Christians
Alcibiades

Alcibiades